Thelma Mary Given Verdi (March 9, 1896 — December 25, 1977) was an American violinist and child musical prodigy.

Early life 
Thelma Mary Given was born in Columbus, Ohio, and raised in Decatur, Illinois, the daughter of James Frederick Given and Emma Jones Given. Her musical abilities were recognized by age 5.  She studied with Leopold Auer in Russia. She toured Europe with Auer as a teenager, and was caught in the tumult of war and the Russian Revolution for almost a year before she and her mother were able to return to the United States.

Career 
Given made her American debut at Carnegie Hall in 1918. She returned to the Carnegie Hall stage several times. She toured in the United States and Europe in the 1920s and 1930s, given recitals and as guest soloist with orchestras. She played a Guarneri violin made in 1738.

Personal life 
Given lived much of her adult life living with her mother and brother Eben Given (a painter), at Saranac Lake, and in the arts colony at Provincetown, Massachusetts, in social circles that included playwright Eugene O'Neill. She married in 1943, as the third wife of Minturn de Suzzara Verdi, a New York lawyer.

Thelma Given Verdi was widowed in 1970, and she died on Christmas Day, 1977, aged 81 years, in Boston, Massachusetts, after a stroke. Papers associated with Thelma Given, including concert programs, letters, and a clippings album of reviews, are archived by the Provincetown History Preservation Project.

References

External links 

1896 births
1977 deaths
American classical violinists
American women in World War I
American expatriates in the Russian Empire
Women classical violinists